Ornithogalum xanthochlorum is a species of flowering plant in the genus Ornithogalum. It is endemic to the Cape Provinces of South Africa. It also known as the Namaqua chink or slangkop (Afrikaans for snake head).

Distribution 
Ornithogalum xanthochlorum is found in the Northern Cape and the Western Cape.

Gallery

Conservation status 
Ornithogalum xanthochlorum is classified as Least Concern.

References

External links 
 
 

Endemic flora of South Africa
Flora of South Africa
Flora of the Cape Provinces
Plants described in 1897
Taxa named by John Gilbert Baker
xanthochlorum